Boarded Hall is a small locality in the parish of Christ Church, Barbados.

It takes its name from a sugar plantation owned by the Blackman family. The estate was the ancestral home of Sir George Harnage, 1st Baronet who lost the plantation to bankruptcy in 1823.

References 

Populated places in Barbados